The Johannesburg tramway network formed part of the public transport system in Johannesburg, South Africa, for just over 70 years until the start of the 1960s.

History
From , it was converted to electrical power.

However, the tramway network lasted for several more decades, until its closure on 18 March 1961. The last scheduled trams ran on the Kensington, Bez Valley and Malvern routes on the day before, and on the day of closure special commemorative trips were run. The trams on those routes were replaced by buses.

See also

History of Johannesburg
List of town tramway systems in Africa
Rail transport in South Africa
Trolleybuses in Johannesburg

References

Notes

Further reading

External links

Passenger rail transport in South Africa
Johannesburg
Transport in Johannesburg
Johannesburg